Ri Hyon-ju (born 20 February 1996 in Pyongyang) is a North Korean diver. He competed in the 10 metre platform at the 2012 Summer Olympics.

References

North Korean male divers
Divers at the 2012 Summer Olympics
Olympic divers of North Korea
1996 births
Living people
Divers at the 2014 Asian Games
Universiade medalists in diving
Universiade gold medalists for North Korea
Asian Games competitors for North Korea
Medalists at the 2017 Summer Universiade